Gittin' Down is the second album release for the Los Angeles, California -based band L.T.D.

Track listing 
"Don't Lose Your Cool" - (Henry E. Davis, Jeffrey Osborne)  2:44 	
"Groove for a Little While" - (Jeffrey Osborne)  3:21 	
"Your Love is The Answer" - (Jeffrey Osborne, James Davis)  2:53 	
"Eldorado Joe" - (Henry E. Davis)   4:21 	
"Tryin' to Find a Way" - (Billy Osborne)  3:04 	
"Ain't No Way" - (Billy Osborne, Jeffrey Osborne)  2:47 	
"It's You" - (Lorenzo Carnegie)  3:04 	
"Look in My Eyes" - (Abraham J. Miller, Jr., James Davis)   3:17 	
"Churn Baby Churn" - (Abraham J. Miller, Jr.)  3:00 	
"Sweet Thang" - (Carle Vickers, Jeffrey Osborne)  2:35 	
"You Can Be Free" - (Jake Riley, James Davis)  5:17

Personnel 
Jeffrey Osborne - Lead and Backing Vocals, Drums, Percussion
Billy Osborne - Clavinet, Organ, Piano, Synthesizer, Drums, Keyboards, Lead and Backing Vocals
Jimmie Davis - Clavinet, Electric Piano, Synthesizer, Harpsichord, Piano, Lead and Backing Vocals
Henry Davis - Bass, Guitar, Celesta, Percussion
Carle Vickers - Soprano Saxophone, Trumpet, Backing Vocals
Abraham "Onion" Miller - Tenor Saxophone, Percussion, Lead and Backing Vocals
Lorenzo Carnegie - Alto Saxophone, Tenor Saxophone
Toby Wynn - Baritone Saxophone, Alto Saxophone
Jake Riley - Trombone, Percussion
Pondaza Santiel - Congas, Bongos, Percussion

Charts

References

External links
 L.T.D.-Gittin' Down at Discogs

1974 albums
L.T.D. (band) albums
A&M Records albums